Joris Nieuwenhuis (born 11 February 1996) is a Dutch cyclist, who currently rides for UCI WorldTeam . In August 2020, he was named in the startlist for the 2020 Tour de France.

Major results

Cyclo-cross

2012–2013
 3rd National Junior Championships
2013–2014
 1st  National Junior Championships
 2nd Junior Brabant
 UCI Junior World Cup
3rd Tábor
3rd Namur
 3rd Junior Rucphen
2014–2015
 2nd National Under-23 Championships
2015–2016
 3rd Overall UCI Under-23 World Cup
1st Heusden-Zolder
3rd Lignières-en-Berry
 Under-23 Bpost Bank Trophy
3rd Koppenberg
2016–2017
 1st  UCI World Under-23 Championships
 1st  National Under-23 Championships
 1st  Overall UCI Under-23 World Cup
1st Zeven
1st Namur
1st Heusden-Zolder
1st Hoogerheide
2nd Cauberg
 2nd Overall Under-23 Superprestige
1st Gieten
1st Middelkerke
1st Hoogstraten
2nd Zonhoven
2nd Diegem
3rd Gavere
3rd Spa-Francorchamps
3rd Ruddervoorde
 2nd  UEC European Under-23 Championships
 3rd Overall DVV Trophy
1st Ronse
 3rd Brabant
2017–2018
 1st  National Under-23 Championships
 2nd  UCI World Under-23 Championships
 UCI Under-23 World Cup
3rd Heusden-Zolder
3rd Hoogerheide
2018–2019
 2nd Rucphen
 UCI World Cup
3rd Heusden-Zolder
 3rd Woerden
2019–2020
 2nd Woerden
 3rd National Championships
2022–2023
 2nd National Championships
 UCI World Cup
3rd Besançon

Road

2014
 5th Overall Int. Junioren Driedaagse van Axel
2016
 1st  Mountains classification, Boucles de la Mayenne
2018
 9th Antwerp Port Epic
2019
 6th Road race, European Games
 7th Overall Tour of Norway
2020
 3rd Paris–Tours

Grand Tour general classification results timeline

References

External links

1996 births
Living people
Dutch male cyclists
People from Doetinchem
Cyclists from Gelderland
European Games competitors for the Netherlands
Cyclists at the 2019 European Games
Cyclo-cross cyclists
21st-century Dutch people